Berthold Grünfeld  (22 January 1932 – 20 August 2007) was a Norwegian psychiatrist, sexologist, and professor of social medicine at the University of Oslo. He was also a recognized expert in forensic psychiatry, often employed by Norwegian courts to examine insanity defense pleas.

Biography
Grünfeld was born in Bratislava in what was then Czechoslovakia. In 1939, when he was seven, he and 34 other Jewish children were separated from their families in an attempt by Nansenhjelpen to rescue them from the early manifestations of the Holocaust. The group of children was sent by train to Norway via Berlin, after having been told they would never again see their parents.

Once in Norway, Grünfeld was first placed at the Jewish children's home in Oslo, then lived as a foster child with a Jewish family in Trondheim before returning to the orphanage. During the occupation of Norway, Grünfeld avoided capture and deportation by fleeing with members of the Norwegian Resistance in 1942 to neutral Sweden, where he stayed until the war ended. He returned to the children's home in 1946. The Jewish community funded his education.

Berthold Grünfeld earned his medical degree in 1960, when he also met his future wife Gunhild. He was awarded his doctorate in medicine in 1973 based on a dissertation on abortion. In 1993, he was made professor of social medicine at the University of Oslo. 

Grünfeld was noted for his academic contributions within sexology, on the issues of abortion and euthanasia, and within forensic psychology. In addition to his advocacy and teaching, he acted as an expert witness in criminal cases, and as a consultant on human relations and sexology for Oslo Helseråd. His dissertation influenced the reform of abortion laws in Norway.

Grünfeld and his wife had three children and six grandchildren. In 2005, his daughter Nina Grünfeld made a film, Origin Unknown, about her efforts to research her father's background and heritage. Among other things, she found that his mother had worked as a prostitute and was murdered in the death camp at Sobibor.

Awards and decorations
Commander of The Royal Norwegian Order of St. Olav

External links
Dagbladet: Portrait in a Norwegian newspaper 
Dagbladet: Article about Grünfeld 
 NRK obituary 
 Entry for documentary about Grünfeld at Norsk Filminstitutt

1932 births
2007 deaths
Czechoslovak Jews
Jewish emigrants from Nazi Germany to Norway
Child refugees
Refugees in Sweden
Czechoslovak emigrants to Norway
Children in war
Norwegian psychiatrists
Norwegian sexologists
Norwegian abortion-rights activists